This is a list of women writers who were born in Nigeria or whose writings are closely associated with that country.

A
Hafsat Abdulwaheed (born 1952), author, poet, writing in Hausa
Catherine Acholonu (1951–2014), researcher, author, playwright, socio-political activist, professor
Ayobami Adebayo (born 1988), novelist, short story writer
Bisi Adeleye-Fayemi (born 1963), human rights activist, non-fiction writer
Chimamanda Ngozi Adichie (born 1977), novelist, short story writer, non-fiction writer
Akachi Adimora-Ezeigbo
Abimbola Alao (active since the 1990s), non-fiction writer, short story writer, translator
Lesley Nneka Arimah (born 1983), short story writer
Nana Asma’u (1793–1864), princess, poet, teacher
Sefi Atta (born 1964), novelist, short story writer, playwright 
Adaeze Atuegwu (born 1977), novelist, playwright, non-fiction writer
Ayo Ayoola-Amale (active since 2000), poet, lawyer, cultural educator

B
Simi Bedford (active since the 1990s), novelist

E
Buchi Emecheta (1944–2017), novelist, children's writer, playwright, lived in Britain
Akwaeke Emezi
Rosemary Esehagu (born 1981), Nigerian-American novelist

F
Bilkisu Funtuwa (active since 1994), Hausa novelist

I
Jordan Ifueko (born 1997), fantasy writer 
Bassey Ikpi (born 1976), spoken-word poet, writer, mental health advocate
Elizabeth Isichei (born 1939), non-fiction writer, historian, educator
Betty Irabor, website magazine columnist

K
Karen King-Aribisala (active since 1990), novelist, short story writer

M
Amina Mama (born 1958), non-fiction writer, educator
Sarah Ladipo Manyika (born 1968), Anglo-Nigerian novelist, short story writer, essayist
Angela Miri (born 1959), academic and poet

N
Nkiru Njoku (born c. 1980), screenwriter
Martina Nwakoby (born 1937), children's writer, novelist
Flora Nwapa (1931–1993), novelist, short story writer, poet, children's writer, first African woman novelist published in Britain
Adaobi Tricia Nwaubani (born 1976), novelist, humorist, essayist, journalist
Nike Campbell, Nigerian-Ukrainian writer and finance management professional

O
Taiwo Odubiyi (born 1965), romance novelist, children's writer, religious columnist
Molara Ogundipe (born 1940), poet, critic, non-fiction writer
P. A. Ogundipe (1927–2020), educator and first Nigerian woman to be published in English
Chioma Okereke, Nigerian-born poet, author and short story writer
Julie Okoh (born 1947), playwright, feminist, educator
Nnedi Okorafor (born 1974), science fiction and fantasy writer, Nigerian-American Nnedi Okorafor
Ifeoma Okoye (born 1937), novelist, short story writer, children's writer
Chinelo Okparanta (active since 2010), Nigerian-American short story writer, educator
Ukamaka Olisakwe (born 1982), feminist writer, short story writer, screenwriter
Ayodele Olofintuade, novelist and journalist
Nuzo Onoh (born 1962), African Horror writer
Osonye Tess Onwueme (born 1955), playwright, scholar, poet
Ifeoma Onyefulu (born 1959), children's writer, novelist, photographer
Bukola Oriola (born 1976), Nigerian American journalist, autobiographer
Ayisha Osori (active since the late 1990s), lawyer, journalist, business executive
Helen Ovbiagele (born 1944), romance novelist
Helen Oyeyemi (born 1984), novelist

P
Charmaine Pereira (active since the 1990s), feminist scholar, non-fiction writer

S
Abidemi Sanusi (active since 2000), novelist
Mabel Segun (born 1930), poet, children's writer
Taiye Selasi (born 1979), novelist, short story writer, photographer
Lola Shoneyin (born 1974), poet, novelist
Zulu Sofola (1935–1995), Nigeria's first published female playwright, educator

T
Grace Oladunni Taylor (fl.1970–2004), biochemist, non-fiction writer
Teresa Meniru (1931–1994), children's writer

U
Ada Udechukwu (born 1960), poet and artist
Purity Ada Uchechukwu (born 1971), academic
Adaora Lily Ulasi (born 1932), journalist, novelist
Rosina Umelo (born 1930), short story writer, children's writer
Chika Unigwe (born 1974), novelist, short story writer
Pauline Uwakweh or Pauline Onwubiko, writer and academic

W
Molara Wood (born 1969) journalist, short story writer 
Myne Whitman (born 1977), romance novelist

Y
Balaraba Ramat Yakubu (born 1959), romance novelist

References

-
Nigerian
Writers
Writers, women